Qarah Bolagh (also Romanized as Qarah Bolāgh; also known as Qal‘eh Zīr) is a village in Shoja Rural District, in the Central District of Jolfa County, East Azerbaijan Province, Iran. At the 2006 census, its population was 467, in 125 families.

References 

Populated places in Jolfa County